The Pame languages are a group of languages in Mexico that is spoken by around 12,000 Pame people in the state of San Luis Potosí. It belongs to the Oto-Pamean branch of the Oto-Manguean language family.

Distribution and languages
Ethnologue notes two living varieties of Pame both spoken in the state of San Luis Potosí: Central Pame, in the town of Santa María Acapulco, and Northern Pame, in communities from the north of Río Verde to the border with Tamaulipas.

The third variety, Southern Pame, was last described in the mid 20th century, is assumed to be extinct, and is very sparsely documented. It was spoken in Jiliapan, Hidalgo, and Pacula, Querétaro.

Northern Pame (Ñãʔũ) (~6,000)
Central Pame (Šiʔúi) (~6,000)
Southern Pame (Šiyúi) (†)

Classification
The Pame languages are part of the Oto-Pamean branch of the Oto-Manguean language family. They are most closely related to the Chichimeca Jonaz language, spoken in Guanajuato, and together, they form the Pamean language groups. During the colonial period, two grammatical descriptions were written.

Phonology

Consonants 
Berthiaume (2004) report a complex phonology for Northern Pame with contrasts between plain, voiced, aspirated, and glottalized consonants both for the stops, nasals, affricates and approximants.

Pame languages are tonal but the exact number of tonal contrasts is a matter of debate. Avelino, Gibson and Manrique have analyzed the language as having three tones: high and low level tones and a falling contour tone (Suárez 1983, pg. 51). However, Berthiaume (2004) argues that only a high and a rising tone exist, no low, level tone.

Vowels

Grammar

Pame grammar is characterized by complex morphophonemics and suppletion. Many grammatical categories are marked by exchanging consonants in patterns that are not fully predictable. The morphology is head-marking, marking agreement with possessors on nouns and with the participants in actions on verbs. Its personal system distinguishes between singular, dual and plural number in all persons, and there is also an exclusive first-person category ("we but not you").

Pame has an octal (base-8) counting system, as the Pame keep counting their knuckles, rather than the fingers.

Examples 

The following table shows the numbers and some basic words in different varieties of Pame:

Media
Pame-language programming is carried by the CDI's radio station XEANT-AM, based in Tancanhuitz de Santos, San Luis Potosí.

References

Bibliography
Suaréz, Jorge A. 1983. The Mesoamerican Indian Languages. Cambridge: CUP
Berthiaume, S. C. (2004). A phonological grammar of Northern Pame (Doctoral dissertation, PhD thesis, University of Texas at Arlington).
Avelino, H. (2006). The typology of Pame number systems and the limits of Mesoamerica as a linguistic area. Linguistic Typology, 9, 493–513.
Gibson, L. F. (1956). Pame (Otomi) phonemics and morphophonemics. International Journal of American Linguistics, 22(4), 242–265.
Gibson, Lorna, and Doris Bartholomew. "Pame noun inflection." International Journal of American Linguistics 45, no. 4 (1979): 309–322.
Manrique Castañeda, Leonardo. "Análisis preliminar del vocabulario pame de Fray Juan Guadalupe Soriano." In Anales de Antropología, vol. 12, no. 1. 2009.
Castañeda, L. M. (1960). Dos gramáticas pames del siglo XVIII. Anales del Instituto Nacional de Antropología e Historia, sexta época (1945-1967), 11, 283–287.
Lastra, Y. (2015). Tratado del arte y unión de los idiomas otomí y pame; Vocabularios de los idiomas pame, otomi, mexicano y jonaz de Fray Juan Guadalupe Soriano.
Manrique Castañeda, Leonardo. 1967. Jiliapan Pame. The Handbook of Middle American Indians, ed. by Robert Wauchope, general editor, Norman McQuown, volume editor, vol. 5, 331–48. Austin: University of Texas Press.
 Soustelle, Jacques [1937] (1992): La familia Otomí-Pame de México Central, Fondo de Cultura Económica, México DF, .

External links
 A Phonological Grammar of Northern Pame 

Indigenous languages of Mexico
Oto-Manguean languages
Oto-Pamean languages
Endangered Oto-Manguean languages